Gaffer tape (also known as gaffer's tape, gaff tape or gaffa tape as well as spike tape for narrow, colored gaffer tape) is a heavy cotton cloth pressure-sensitive tape with strong adhesive and tensile properties. It is widely used in theatre, photography, film, radio and television production, and industrial staging work.

While sometimes confused with duct tape, gaffer tape differs in the composition of both the backing, which is made from fabric as opposed to vinyl or other plastics, and the adhesive, which is more resistant to heat and more easily removed without damaging the surface to which it adhered.

History 

The precise origin of the name is unknown, one theory being that it is named for the gaffer (chief lighting technician) on a film crew. When cables are taped down on a stage or other surface, either to prevent tripping hazards or conceal them from view of the audience or camera, they are said to be gaffed or gaffered.

Gaffer tape was invented in 1959 by Ross Lowell, director, cinematographer, and founder of Lowel-Light. Lowell transferred the adhesive from Johnson & Johnson's Permacel tape, also known as duct tape, to silver fabric, and Lowel-Light introduced gaffer tape to the market.

Properties and uses 

Gaffer tape is manufactured in many colors, including fluorescent and custom colors, but perhaps the most common variety is matte black. A matte finish keeps the tape from reflecting light, so that it blends in with a typical stage floor. Gaffer tape is strong, yet can be torn by hand, so no cutting tools are necessary, and it can easily be ripped into narrower strips when desired. The synthetic adhesive typically leaves little or no residue and will generally not damage most surfaces when it is removed. Gaffer tape is usually more expensive than duct tape because it is manufactured in smaller quantities, has more exacting specifications, and is marketed for professional use.

A common application for gaffer tape is securing cables to a stage floor, podium, or other surface, either for safety or concealment. It is also frequently used whenever a quick ad hoc fix is required, from temporarily attaching fixtures or props, to salvaging a broken piece of production equipment. A narrow version of gaffer tape, called spike tape, is used in theater productions for floor layout.

In the absence of console tape or artist tape, live sound engineers or light board operators may use a strip of white gaffer tape along the bottom of a mixing board to label the channels or submasters used for a particular show.

In rock climbing gyms, gaffer tape can be used to mark climbs on the wall. It is preferable to duct tape because it is stronger and lasts longer on the wall.

See also 

 Best boy
 Dolly grip
 List of adhesive tapes
 Speed tape
 Theatrical technician

References 

Stagecraft
Adhesive tape